Miguel Ángel Miranda Guerra (born November 12, 1983) is a male light-flyweight boxer from Venezuela, who represented his native country at the 2004 Summer Olympics in Athens, Greece. There he was outscored in the first round of the men's light-flyweight division (– 48 kg) by Cuba's eventual gold medalist Yan Bartelemí. He qualified for the Olympic Games by ending up in first place at the 2nd AIBA American 2004 Olympic Qualifying Tournament in Rio de Janeiro, Brazil.

References
sports-reference

1983 births
Living people
Light-flyweight boxers
Boxers at the 2004 Summer Olympics
Olympic boxers of Venezuela
Venezuelan male boxers